Juuso Riikola (born 9 November 1993) is a Finnish professional ice hockey defenseman currently playing with IK Oskarshamn of the Swedish Hockey League (SHL). His brother, Simo-Pekka also played professionally.

Playing career
Riikola made his SM-liiga debut playing with KalPa as a 19-year-old during the 2012–13 SM-liiga season. He dressed for 20 games while posting 6 assists from the blueline.

In his sixth season with KalPa in 2017–18, and while serving as an alternate captain, Riikola scored a career high 8 goals for 24 points in 59 games.

On 17 May 2018, as an undrafted free agent, Riikola signed a one-year, entry-level deal with the Pittsburgh Penguins of the NHL for a reported $925,000. He made his NHL debut on 11 October 2018 against the Vegas Golden Knights at PPG Paints Arena. Riikola recorded his first career NHL point, an assist, on 28 November against the Colorado Avalanche. He scored his first NHL goal on 29 December 2018 against the St. Louis Blues.

On 30 May 2019, the Penguins re-signed Riikola to a one-year, one-way contract extension worth $850,000. On 16 October 2019, against the Colorado Avalanche, Riikola played as a left winger due to injuries to several Penguins forwards.

On 5 September 2020, the Penguins signed Riikola to a two-year, $2.3 million extension.

After four seasons within the Penguins organization and as a pending free agent, Riikola opted to return to Europe in securing a one-year contract with Swedish club, IK Oskarshamn of the SHL, on 25 May 2022.

International play
Riikola played for the Finland national team at the 2018 IIHF World Championship.

Career statistics

Regular season and playoffs

International

References

External links

1993 births
Living people
Finnish ice hockey defencemen
KalPa players
IK Oskarshamn players
People from Joensuu
Pittsburgh Penguins players
Undrafted National Hockey League players
Wilkes-Barre/Scranton Penguins players
Sportspeople from North Karelia